Enigmatic Ocean is a studio album by French jazz fusion artist Jean-Luc Ponty, released in 1977. It features guitarists Allan Holdsworth and Daryl Stuermer, keyboardist Allan Zavod, bassist Ralphe Armstrong (with whom Ponty had played in Mahavishnu Orchestra), and drummer Steve Smith. It reached #1 on the Billboard Jazz album chart in 1977.

Track listing 
All music composed, orchestrated and conducted by Jean-Luc Ponty (from the original album cover).

"Overture" – 0:47
"The Trans-Love Express" – 3:59 
"Mirage" – 4:53
"Enigmatic Ocean - Part I" – 2:23
"Enigmatic Ocean - Part II" – 3:35 
"Enigmatic Ocean - Part III" – 3:42
"Enigmatic Ocean - Part IV" – 2:26
"Nostalgic Lady" – 5:24
"The Struggle of the Turtle to the Sea - Part I" – 3:35
"The Struggle of the Turtle to the Sea - Part II" – 3:34
"The Struggle of the Turtle to the Sea - Part III" – 6:03

Personnel 
 Jean-Luc Ponty – electric violin, five-string electric violin, violectra, bells; grand piano on "Nostalgic Lady"
 Allan Holdsworth – lead electric guitar
 Daryl Stuermer – lead & rhythm electric guitar
 Allan Zavod – organ, synthesizer, electric piano, grand piano, Hohner clavinet
 Ralphe Armstrong – electric basses, fretless bass
 Steve Smith – drums and percussion

Solos 
 (2) : JL Ponty (violin) & D. Stuermer (guitar)
 (3) : JL Ponty (violin) & A. Zavod (synthesizer)
 (5) : JL Ponty (violin), D. Stuermer (guitar), A. Zavod (synthesizer) & A. Holdsworth (guitar)
 (6) : A. Holdsworth (guitar) & JL Ponty (violin)
 (8) : JL Ponty (violin) & A. Holdsworth (guitar)
 (9) : A. Zavod (synthesizer)
 (10) : JL Ponty (violectra)
 (11) : R. Armstrong (bass straight and with devices), D. Stuermer (guitar), S. Smith (drums) & A. Holdsworth (guitar)

Production 
 Producer: Jean-Luc Ponty
 Engineer: Larry Hirsch
 Tape handler technician: Mitch Gibson
 Mastered by John Golden
 Front cover photography by Andy Kent
 Liner photography by Frank Moscati

Chart positions

References

External links 
 Jean-Luc Ponty - Enigmatic Ocean (1977) album review by Alex Henderson, credits & releases at AllMusic
 Jean-Luc Ponty - Enigmatic Ocean (1977) album releases & credits at Discogs
 Jean-Luc Ponty - Enigmatic Ocean (1977) album credits & user reviews at ProgArchives.com
 Jean-Luc Ponty - Enigmatic Ocean (1977) album to be listened as stream on Spotify

1977 albums
Jean-Luc Ponty albums
Atlantic Records albums